The 2021 South Alabama Jaguars softball team represented the University of South Alabama during the 2021 NCAA Division I softball season. The Jaguars played their home games at Jaguar Field. The Jaguars were led by fifteenth-year head coach Becky Clark and were members of the Sun Belt Conference.

Preseason

Sun Belt Conference Coaches Poll
The Sun Belt Conference Coaches Poll was released on February 8, 2021. South Alabama was picked to finish eighth in the Sun Belt Conference with 36 votes.

National Softball Signing Day

Roster

Coaching staff

Schedule and results

Schedule Source:
*Rankings are based on the team's current ranking in the NFCA/USA Softball poll.

Gainesville Regional

Posteason

Conference Accolades 
Player of the Year: Ciara Bryan – LA
Pitcher of the Year: Summer Ellyson – LA
Freshman of the Year: Sara Vanderford – TXST
Newcomer of the Year: Ciara Bryan – LA
Coach of the Year: Gerry Glasco – LA

All Conference First Team
Ciara Bryan (LA)
Summer Ellyson (LA)
Sara Vanderford (TXST)
Leanna Johnson (TROY)
Jessica Mullins (TXST)
Olivia Lackie (USA)
Kj Murphy (UTA)
Katie Webb (TROY)
Jayden Mount (ULM)
Kandra Lamb (LA)
Kendall Talley (LA)
Meredith Keel (USA)
Tara Oltmann (TXST)
Jade Sinness (TROY)
Katie Lively (TROY)

All Conference Second Team
Kelly Horne (TROY)
Meagan King (TXST)
Mackenzie Brasher (USA)
Bailee Wilson (GASO)
Makiya Thomas (CCU)
Kaitlyn Alderink (LA)
Abby Krzywiecki (USA)
Kenzie Longanecker (APP)
Alissa Dalton (LA)
Julie Rawls (LA)
Korie Kreps (ULM)
Kayla Rosado (CCU)
Justice Milz (LA)
Gabby Buruato (APP)
Arieann Bell (TXST)

References:

Rankings

References

South Alabama
South Alabama Jaguars softball
South Alabama Jaguars softball seasons